Glenn E. Good is the 13th dean of the College of Education at the University of Florida.

Good is the current dean of the College of Education at University of Florida, which has an annual budget of $60 million, serves 3,000 students, and has 800 employees. Good was named the dean of the college effective October, 2011.

Good graduated from the University of California at Davis with a bachelor's degree in psychology.  He earned a master's degree in counseling from the University of Oregon.  He completed his doctorate in psychology from Ohio State University. Prior to coming to the University of Florida, he was a professor and associate dean at the University of Missouri-Columbia. While there, he was named Mentor/Advisor of the Year and received the William T. Kemper Fellowship for Teaching Excellence.

Good has received approximately $1M in grants/contracts and authored more than 80 scholarly journal articles, chapters, and books—including Counseling and Psychotherapy Essentials: Integrating Theories, Skills, and Practices (W. W. Norton) and The New Handbook of Psychotherapy and Counseling with Men (Jossey-Bass).  He has provided more than 180 presentations at national and international conferences. He is a Fellow of the American Psychological Association and four of its divisions. He twice received the Researcher of the Year Award presented by the Society for the Psychological Study of Men and Masculinity.

Good serves in national and international leadership roles, including as: co-chair of the Learning and Education Academic Research Network (LEARN), co-chair of the Association of American Universities College of Education Deans Group, and as a member of the executive committee of the Consortium of University and Research Institutions (CURI) of the American Educational Research Association.

Education 
 Bachelor's degree in psychology from the University of California at Davis in 1977.
 Master's degree in counseling from the University of Oregon in 1979.
 Doctoral degree in psychology from Ohio State University in 1987.
 Post-doctoral study in the Management Development Program of the Graduate School of Education of Harvard University in 2011.

Notes 
 Good’s profile from UF College of Education
 UF names new education dean, citing research strength as key
 About the College of Education at the University of Florida
 University of Florida graduate schools rank high among nation’s top programs

References

External links 
 New UF education dean brings rich research experience (The Gainesville Sun article)
 New education dean selected (Independent Florida Alligator article)
 The 30 Most Influential Deans of Education in the United States

University of Florida faculty
University of California, Davis alumni
University of Oregon alumni
Living people
Year of birth missing (living people)